USS Carolina may refer to:

 , a schooner that played an important role in the Battle of New Orleans
 , a U.S. Coast Guard vessel automatically commissioned into the U.S. Navy during World War I

See also
 
 
 

United States Navy ship names